Nils Henrik Christian Sundgren, known as Nils Petter Sundgren, (24 February 1929 – 30 December 2019) was a Swedish film critic and television presenter for Filmkrönikan broadcast on SVT.

References

External links 

1929 births
2019 deaths
Swedish film critics
Swedish television hosts
Swedish translators
Entertainers from Stockholm
20th-century translators